Isaac Inoke Tosika (born October 10, 1964) is a member of the National Parliament of the Solomon Islands. He represents a constituency in Malaita Province, and was first elected in 2006.

See also
Politics of Solomon Islands

References

External links
Member page at Parliament website

1964 births
Living people
Members of the National Parliament of the Solomon Islands
People from Malaita Province
Place of birth missing (living people)